The Rome metropolitan area is a statistical area that is centred on the city of Rome, Italy. It consists of the entire province of Metropolitan City of Rome Capital (formerly known as the Province of Rome) and a single comune, Aprilia, in the neighbouring Province of Latina. Both provinces are part of the region of Lazio. The metropolitan area does not have any administrative designation or function unlike the Metropolitan City of Rome Capital.

Composition
The Rome metropolitan area includes the city of Rome and 59 municipalities. It is the third-most populous in Italy with a population of 4,353,738 . All are within the Metropolitan City of Rome Capital except Aprilia in the Province of Latina.

The most important of these by population are: Guidonia Montecelio, Aprilia, Fiumicino, Tivoli, Ciampino, and Velletri; as shows the table below.

Municipalities

See also

References

External links

Geography of Lazio

Metropolitan areas of Italy
Metropolitan City of Rome Capital
Province of Latina